Jacques Leblanc (August 23, 1921 – November 13, 2012) is a Québécois physiologist and professor, born in Saint-Joachim-de-Montmorency.  He is considered to be one of the pioneers of contemporary biomedical research in Quebec and Canada.

Honours/Awards

 1989 - Winner of the Prix Marie-Victorin
 1991 - Winner of the Léo-Pariseau Prize
 1992 - Made an emeritus member of American College of Foot and Ankle Surgeons
 1994 - Winner of the Prix Michel-Sarrazin

References
Jacques Leblack's biography at the homepage for the Prix du Quebec

Canadian physiologists
1921 births
2012 deaths
Scientists from Quebec
20th-century Canadian scientists
21st-century Canadian scientists

Academic staff of Université Laval
Université Laval alumni